Inoda may refer to:
 5484 Inoda, a main-belt asteroid
 Shigeru Inoda (1955–2008), a Japanese amateur astronomer